AzSamand was an automobile factory belonging to Evsen Group Company located in Şamaxı, Azerbaijan.

History
The project opened in October 2005, with the support of the Government of Azerbaijan. The automobiles branded "Aziz" have the "AzSamand" label and "Aziz" means "Azərbaycan inamla zirvələrə", that is "Azerbaijan confidently at the top". AzSamand works with Iran Khodro and also was planning to produce cars with diesel engines. In May 2010 both groups submitted designs for the engine.

Models
IKCO Samand (2005–present)
IKCO Samand Soren (2010–present)
IKCO Runna (2010–present)

Gallery

See also
Iran Khodro
IKCO Samand

References

External links
 AzSamand page at Evesen Group
 Evesen Group website  
Iran Khodro official website

2005 establishments in Azerbaijan
Vehicle manufacturing companies established in 2005
Car manufacturers of Azerbaijan
Shamakhi District